Emanuilo Janković (1758–1792) was a Serbian writer, dramatist, philosopher, translator, editor and scientist. He was not only a language reformer but also an innovator in the use of Serbian Cyrillic Graphemes. Also, his research and studies of the detailed chemistry, mineralogy, and isotopic compositions of meteorites provide invaluable clues to the range of chemical and physical processing and timing of events in the solar nebula.

Life
Janković was born in 1758 to a Serbian family in Neusatz Stadt (modern Novi Sad), then part of the Military Frontier of the Habsburg monarchy (now Serbia).

In 1790 he and Damjan Kaulić both independently petitioned for a Serbian printing house in Novi Sad, but were rejected by the Austrian government.

He wrote the first modern Serbian treatise on hygiene.

Legacy
Emanuilo Janković died in 1792 in Subotica. Ruđer Bošković, Dositej Obradović and Atanasije Stojković were his contemporaries. In his lifetime and after death, Emanuilo Janković was more noted as a philosopher and man of letters than a scientist. But as the years progressed, his early research on meteorites became Meteor Science and his reputation as a scientist was also recognized.

His importance lies in his pioneering work at the period of the Age of Enlightenment in such diverse fields as science, drama, and publishing, as well as in the use of the vernacular in literature. Janković was a native of Novi Sad, Banat, and his critics regard him as a crude precursor of Vuk Karadžić, the famed reformer of the Serbian language. He wrote "Fiziceskkoe Socinenie" (Treatise on Physics).

He made significant and wide-ranging contributions to Serbian cultural life, though little recognition has been accorded to him in Serbia. Unfortunately little is known about his personal life. The information we have is fragmentary and to a great extent is provided by the prologues of his works, his one extant letter of 15 September 1790, and German and Latin copies of other of his letters and those of his contemporaries, now preserved in the Budapest State Archives.

Very early on Emanuilo Janković became aware that in eighteenth-century Serbian (no different than the rest of the European languages at the time), there was no normalized literary language and orthography, and that learned men often wrote in an idiom that was incomprehensible to the common folk and the uneducated. Janković read Dositej Obradović and corresponded with him. He knew Dositej's efforts to write in a language that was close to the vernacular and understandable to all. By then, the works of Obradović were being brought to the attention of European scholars, and Jernej Kopitar was among the first to embrace the efforts of Dositej Obradović and Emanuilo Janković.

Emanuilo Janković was one of the authors who applied phonemic principles with relative consistency in solutions involving individual phonemes or phoneme sequences.

He particularly disliked the use of letters, which stood for a sound non-existent in Serbian, and "space-gobbling" and superfluous letters. He read essays by Dositej Obradović and others on language reforms being done throughout Europe and Imperial Russia. These essays had been severely criticized by members of the hierarchy of the Serbian Orthodox Church because they proposed to simplify the traditional Slavonic alphabet for a secular one, by eliminating letters that were duplicates or stood for sounds, not in the Serbian language. The clergy had charged that dropping certain letters would cause the modern orthography to come into "collision" with the Slavonic. Janković defended them, citing Russian spelling that corresponds to Russian speech and not Slavonic. He suggested that Serbs keep the orthography of the church language separate from that of the living language they would use in the new literature.

Bibliography
In chronological order:
  
  
  
   
 

He also published the work of Stefan von Novaković in 1791 Kurzgefasste Abhandlung über die Verdienste und Schicksale der serbischen oder razischen Nazion, in dem Königreiche Hungarn: mit einem Anhang der derselben verliehenen Privilegien

Annotations

See also
 Damjan Kaulić
 Josef von Kurzböck
 Atanasije Dimitrijević Sekereš
 Stefan von Novaković

References

 Adapted and translated from

Further reading

Writers from Novi Sad
Serbian translators
Serbian publishers (people)
Serbian philosophers
Scientists from Novi Sad
1758 births
1792 deaths
Habsburg Serbs
18th-century Serbian people
18th-century Serbian writers
18th-century translators